The Libertarian Party of Missouri is the Missouri affiliate of the Libertarian Party. The state chair is Bill Slantz. Due to the state's low threshold of vote percentage required for ballot access (2% of the votes in a statewide race), the party has been an established party in Missouri with ballot access since 1992.

Elected office holders 
 Ismaine Ayouaz – Crestwood Alderman Ward 4

Eight other Missouri Libertarians were formerly elected Officeholders

See also

 Tamara Millay
 Gary Nolan

References

External links
 Libertarian Party of Missouri
 2018 Candidates
 Twitter
 YouTube Channel
 Party of the Ozarks

Missouri
Political parties in Missouri